Libby Elizabeth Clark (1918–2012) was an African-American journalist whose accomplishments included founding a magazine in Los Angeles, working as a newspaper writer, and forming her own public relations firm.

Early years
Clark was a native of Chester, Pennsylvania and a graduate of Columbia University.

Clark was married four times: in 1942 to Samuel William, a steel worker and pool hall owner in Chester, Pennsylvania, until they divorced in 1947; in 1953 to Walter Stanley, an aircraft worker and gas station owner in Los Angeles, whose marriage was annulled in 1954; in 1970 to Jim Allen, a major building contractor who had been a public relations client for 10 years and who died 7 months after their marriage of a brain injury sustained while inspecting a sub-division he was building; and in 1978 to John Fegan who owned a chain of tuxedo rental stores, whose marriage was annulled after one year.  During the decade from 1957 to 1967, she maintained a professional and personal relationship with the author, William Karl Thomas, who was fifteen years her junior.

Career 
In 1954, Clark launched FEM magazine, a publication that was directed toward women, with a focus on African Americans. Clark said then that besides being informative for readers, she wanted the publication to make potential advertisers aware of the multi-million-dollar purchasing potential of African American women.

Clark wrote for the Chester Times and worked in the West Coast bureau of the Pittsburgh Courier. She later wrote about food and social issues for the Los Angeles Sentinel for 50 years. Her column, "Food For Thought," which injected political awareness into food articles for a grass roots audience, was syndicated in 150 newspapers by Amalgamated Publishers, Inc.  From 1989 to 1994, she published "The Plum Book," an annual ‘Who’s Who’ in the Los Angeles/Southern California black community, and distributed it freely to politicians and community leaders as a community resource. She also edited and co-wrote the Black Family Reunion Cookbook, which sold more than 250,000 copies and made best-seller lists in 1991. In 1951, the University of Southern California (USC) designated Clark as the journalist who would accompany a group of USC students on a two-month tour of Europe and report on the students' activities.

Clark also applied her journalistic skills to public relations when she became the first African-American licensed to own a public relations firm, Libby Clark Associates, in California; she went on to operate the firm for 50 years. In 1969, Los Angeles County hired her as the public information officer for the then-new Martin Luther King Jr. Hospital.

One of her public relations associates was the author, William Karl Thomas, who, in 2013, published a novel titled “Cleo,” based on his ten-year professional association with Miss Clark during the 1950s and 1960s.  In it he describes her personal friendships with famous personalities Lena Horne, Dorothy Dandridge, James Baldwin, Tom Bradley, Leo Branton, and others.  He also includes excerpts from her 1960 coverage of the Nigerian Independence in Africa with excerpts from her interviews with Golda Meir, Abubakar Tafawa Balewa, and Princess Alexandra from England.  Thomas’ publisher's website includes a sampling of his photography with photos of Libby Clark.

Recognition
When she was 85 years old, Clark received the National Newspaper Publishers Association’s Lifetime Achievement Award. In 1992, she was honored with a benefit dinner in recognition of her five decades of service to journalism. Funds raised at the event went to the McGarrity Memorial African-American Scholarship Fund, which helps African-American students. The evening included "proclamations from many of California's most prominent politicians praising her for years of service to the community."

Death 
Clark died of Alzheimer's disease in Inglewood, California, in 2012.

References 

1918 births
2012 deaths
Journalists from Pennsylvania
Columbia University alumni
American book editors
African-American women journalists
African-American journalists
20th-century African-American people
21st-century African-American people
20th-century African-American women
21st-century African-American women